The Bordered Blue Banner was one of the Eight Banners of Manchu military and society during the Later Jin and Qing dynasty of China. It was one of the lower five banners. According to the general annals of the Eight Banners, the Bordered Blue Banner was one of the banners located on the south right wing (Blue banners are located southward, the Plain Blue Banner being on the south left wing).

This banner was commanded by Prince Zheng, the lineage of Šurhaci and his son Jirgalang. By the blood of its commanders the Bordered Blue Banner was the remotest banner out of the Eight Banners; as all the other banners were led by descendants of Nurhaci. Due to its genealogical status, this banner was usually seen as the last banner of the Eight Banners although there were no concrete laws to officially acknowledge this status.

Some parts of Haixi Jurchens were incorporated into this banner after the defeat of the Haixi Jurchens by Jianzhou Jurchens.

Notable members 
Empress Dowager Cixi
Empress Nara
Sushun of Aisin-Gioro
Shang Kexi
Duanhua
Gu Taiqing
Šarhūda
Imperial Noble Consort Xianzhe
Noble Consort Yu

Notable clans 

 Irgen Gioro
 Sirin Gioro
 Šušu Gioro
 Hešeri
 Nara clan
 Gogiya
 Keliyete
 Shang
 Giorca

References

Bibliography

Further reading 
 

 

Eight Banners